The Leopardess is a 1923 American silent South Seas melodrama film produced by Famous Players-Lasky and distributed by Paramount Pictures. The film was directed by Henry Kolker, and starred Alice Brady in her next to last silent film.

Cast
Alice Brady as Tiare
Edward Langford as Captain Croft
Montagu Love as Scott Quaigg
Charles Kent as Angus McKenzie
George Beranger as Pepe (credited as George Andre Beranger)
Marguerite Forrest as Evoa
Glorie Eller as Mamoe

Preservation
With no copies of The Leopardess listed in any film archives, it is thought to be a lost film.

See also
List of lost films

References

External links

Lantern slide advertising film (Wayback Machine)

1923 films
American silent feature films
Lost American films
Films based on short fiction
Paramount Pictures films
1923 drama films
Silent American drama films
American black-and-white films
Films based on works by Katharine Newlin Burt
1923 lost films
Lost drama films
1920s American films